Jarkko Kauvosaari (born October 17, 1983) is a Finnish professional ice hockey player. He currently plays for Lukko in the SM-liiga.

References

1983 births
Finnish ice hockey centres
Living people
Lukko players